Jacobus Wilhelmus "Co" Stompé (born 10 September 1962) is a Dutch former professional darts player. He was nicknamed The Matchstick because of his almost bald head and very thin appearance, making him look like a matchstick. He was also one of very few professionals who played in longsleeved shirts.

Darts career

BDO

For years, Stompé was considered the third best Dutch darts player behind Raymond van Barneveld and Roland Scholten. After reaching the semi-finals of the 2000 World Championship, he dropped back behind a younger emerging Dutch group of players.

Stompé came back to fame with the defeat of reigning BDO champion Jelle Klaasen in the first round of the 2007 World Championship.

Towards the end of his BDO career, Stompé also acted as a darts commentator for Dutch commercial television station SBS6.

PDC
On 11 June 2008 it was announced that Stompé had joined the Professional Darts Corporation circuit, and had to join the PDC rankings at 227. He made his PDC debut in the two PDPA Players Championship tournaments in Bristol. The first tournament started with a bye into the last 64, due to van Barneveld not taking part. He lost to Matt Clark. The next day saw him beat Tony Ayres and Peter Manley before losing in the last 32 stage to Kirk Shepherd.

He then qualified for the 2008 Las Vegas Desert Classic but lost in the first round to Dennis Priestley.

Stompé won the 2008 PDC German Darts Championship, beating Phil Taylor 4–2 in the final. Both players averaged well in excess of 100; Stompé averaged 107.28, while Taylor averaged 108.09. The win earned him a spot in the 2009 Grand Slam of Darts and also earned him a place in the 2009 World Championship qualifying through the Continental Europe Order of Merit. He originally qualified through Dutch broadcaster SBS6's wildcard place which then went to Remco van Eijden as a result. He defeated 2007 semi-finalist Andy Jenkins in the first round. He also defeated Alan Tabern, the ninth seed in the second round and his impressive form in the championship continued with a 4–0 win over eighth seed Wayne Mardle in the third round. The win set up a quarter final encounter with Taylor, losing 5–0.

Stompé then qualified for the Desert Classic for the second successive year. He defeated Colin Osborne in the first round but lost in round two to Raymond van Barneveld.  He then suffered first round losses in the World Matchplay to Adrian Lewis and in the European Championship to Gary Anderson and also went out at the group stage of the Grand Slam of Darts. His defence of the German Darts Championship ended in the last 32 with a loss to Ronnie Baxter.

At the 2010 World Championship, Stompé defeated Steve Maish, Mervyn King and Mark Dudbridge to reach the quarter finals once more but was defeated by Mark Webster. He then reached the quarter finals of the 2010 World Matchplay, defeating Andy Hamilton and Mark Webster before losing to Raymond van Barneveld.

On 18 October that year, Stompé broke into the PDC Top 16 for the first time, dropping out three weeks later. In December, he partnered van Barneveld in the Netherlands team which won the inaugural PDC World Cup of Darts. Later that month, Stompé was knocked out of the 2011 World Championship in the first round, losing 1–3 to Peter Wright.
Stompé comfortably beat Michael Smith 3–0 in the first round of the 2012 World Championship. He was bitten by a dog over the Christmas period and couldn't replicate the form he showed days earlier as he lost 1–4 in the second round to Terry Jenkins, hitting just 28% of his doubles. 2012 proved to be a disappointing year for Stompé as he could not reach a single quarter-final out of the 25 tournaments he played, with his best finishes being last 16 defeats in Pro Tour events.

Stompé dropped out of the top 32 during 2012, but qualified for the 2013 World Championship by finishing fifth on the European Order of Merit, taking the first of four spots for non-qualified players. He lost 0–3 to Paul Nicholson in the first round. After the tournament he was world ranked number 40. Stompé lost 5–4 to Michael Mansell in the second round of the UK Open. He only played in four more events during the rest of the year with his final PDC tournament coming in September.

BDO return
Stompe returned to the BDO in 2014. He made his return to high-profile televised BDO tournaments at the Zuiderduin Masters.

PDC return
In December 2017, RTL 7 announced that Stompé would take part in qualifying school in early 2018 in an attempt to regain his tour card, he postponed this attempted stating at the time that he had had 'too many other things on his mind', along with his son Co Stompe Jnr he attempted to win a tour card in 2019, neither of them were able to do so.

Personal life
Co is married to his second wife Danielle. He proposed to her on stage after winning the WDF World Cup with the Netherlands. Stompé's son, also called Co (born 1991), plays on the PDC Youth Tour, and reached the final of an event in Crawley in May 2011. Stompe has "adopted" Portsmouth as his football team, due to the support he has received from fans.

Stompé and his wife were found guilty of taxation fraud in 2017. They received work sentences of 150 and 190 hours of work for tax fraud respectively. The court in Almelo considered forgery of documents and the deliberate submission of incorrect declarations for turnover and income tax for the years 2009 through 2013 to have been proven. The couple also received a conditional prison sentence of three months.
The fraud was estimated to be more than 100,000 euros.

World Championship results

BDO
1996: 1st round (lost to Steve Beaton 0–3)
1998: 1st round (lost to Roland Scholten 2–3)
1999: 2nd round (lost to Roland Scholten 2–3)
2000: Semi-finalist (lost to Ronnie Baxter 2–5)
2001: 2nd round (lost to Wayne Mardle 0–3)
2002: 2nd round (lost to Bob Taylor 2–3)
2003: 1st round (lost to Martin Adams 1–3)
2004: 1st round (lost to Robert Wagner 2–3)
2005: 1st round (lost to André Brantjes 2–3)
2006: 1st round (lost to Paul Hanvidge 1–3)
2007: 2nd round (lost to Martin Adams 1–4)
2008: 2nd round (lost to Brian Woods 2–4)

PDC
2009: Quarter-finalist (lost to Phil Taylor 0–5)
2010: Quarter-finalist (lost to Mark Webster 3–5)
2011: 1st round (lost to Peter Wright 1–3)
2012: 2nd round (lost to Terry Jenkins 1–4)
2013: 1st round (lost to Paul Nicholson 0–3)

WSDT
 2023: 1st round (lost to John Part 2-3)

Career finals

WDF major finals: 1 (1 title)

PDC team finals: 1 (1 title)

WDF team finals: 4 (1 title, 3 runner-up)

Career statistics

(W) Won; (F) finalist; (SF) semifinalist; (QF) quarterfinalist; (#R) rounds 6, 5, 4, 3, 2, 1; (RR) round-robin stage; (Prel.) Preliminary round; (DNQ) Did not qualify; (DNP) Did not participate; (NH) Not held

Performance timeline

References

External links
Stompé career details on dartsdatabase
Stompé on modusdarts.tv

1962 births
Living people
Dutch darts players
Dutch sports announcers
Professional Darts Corporation former tour card holders
Sportspeople from Amsterdam
British Darts Organisation players
PDC ranking title winners
PDC World Cup of Darts Dutch championship team